Miguel Ángel Carrilero González (born 3 August 1977), known as Míchel, is a Spanish retired footballer who played as a striker, currently a manager.

In a 15-year professional career, he appeared in 231 Segunda División games over ten seasons (58 goals) in representation of six teams, adding 62 matches and eight goals in La Liga.

Club career
Born in Madrid, Míchel first appeared professionally for UB Conquense (Segunda División B). In late 1997, after a very brief spell in Portugal with F.C. Penafiel, he moved to Rayo Vallecano, where he made his La Liga debut in the 1999–2000 season.

Míchel returned to Rayo three years later, after two loans in the Segunda División: with Sevilla FC, he was a very important attacking unit in a 2001 promotion after a one-year absence. The following campaign, he represented Sporting de Gijón.

After leaving the capital outskirts club in December 2002, scoring only once over two top-flight campaigns, Míchel finished team top scorer in the following two seasons in division two, with Getafe CF (15 goals) and UD Almería (12), as both achieved first-ever promotions to the top tier. In 2004–05 he played mainly as a substitute for the former – also from Madrid – netting twice in a rare start, a 2–0 home win against Real Sociedad on 8 May 2005.

For 2007–08, Míchel stayed in the second division, joining Xerez CD and playing mostly as backup to veteran Yordi, who won the Pichichi for the season. The following campaign they too reached the top division for the first time, but he only contributed three matches in less than 100 minutes of play.

In July 2010, after having made 14 appearances in Xerez's top-tier season, which ended in immediate relegation, scoring in home victories over Real Valladolid (3–0) and Real Zaragoza (3–2), the 33-year-old returned to division three, signing for CD Guadalajara.

References

External links

1977 births
Living people
Spanish footballers
Footballers from Madrid
Association football forwards
La Liga players
Segunda División players
Segunda División B players
Tercera División players
Divisiones Regionales de Fútbol players
UB Conquense footballers
Rayo Vallecano B players
Rayo Vallecano players
Sevilla FC players
Sporting de Gijón players
Getafe CF footballers
UD Almería players
Xerez CD footballers
CD Guadalajara (Spain) footballers
CD Móstoles URJC players
Liga Portugal 2 players
F.C. Penafiel players
Spanish expatriate footballers
Expatriate footballers in Portugal
Spanish expatriate sportspeople in Portugal
Spanish football managers
Tercera División managers